Marjorie Daw may refer to:

"Marjorie Daw" (short story), an 1869 American short story by Thomas Bailey Aldrich
Marjorie Daw (actress) (1902–1979), American film actress

See also 
"See Saw Margery Daw", a nursery rhyme
Marjorie Dawes, a fictional character on the television show Little Britain